The 1997 Union Budget of India, also called the Dream Budget by the Indian media, was presented on February 28, 1997, by Finance Minister P. Chidambaram in the Deve Gowda government. The budget presented a road map for economic reforms in India and included lowering income tax rates, removal of the surcharge on corporate taxes, and reduced corporate tax rates.

References

External links
 Official 97–98 Budget website

Union budgets of India
Economic history of India (1947–present)
1997 government budgets
Gowda administration
1997 in Indian economy
1998 in Indian economy